The 1994 South Australian Soccer Federation season was the 88th season of soccer in South Australia.

1994 SASF Premier League

The 1994 South Australian Premier League season was the top level domestic association football competition in South Australia for 1994, and the first under the Premier League name. It was contested by 8 teams in a 21 round league format, each team playing all of their opponents three times.

League table

Finals

1994 SASF State League

The 1994 South Australian State League season was the second level domestic association football competition in South Australia for 1994, and the first under the State League name. It was contested by 10 teams in a 18 round league format, each team playing all of their opponents twice.

League table

Finals

References

1994 in Australian soccer
Football South Australia seasons